Lophalia auricomis is a species of beetle in the family Cerambycidae. It was described by Chemsak & Linsley in 1979.

References

Trachyderini
Beetles described in 1979